The 11th Directors Guild of America Awards, honoring the outstanding directorial achievements in film and television in 1958, were presented in 1959.

Winners and nominees

Film

Television

D.W. Griffith Award
 Frank Capra

Honorary Life Member
 George Sidney

External links
 

Directors Guild of America Awards
1958 film awards
1958 television awards
Direct
Direct
1958 awards in the United States